Sir George Robinson, 6th Baronet (12 January 1766 – 23 November 1833) was a British landowner and Member of Parliament.

He was born the son of Sir George Robinson, 5th Baronet of Cranford, Northamptonshire and educated at Harrow School (1775–79), Trinity College, Cambridge (1783) and trained in the law at the Middle Temple (1785). He succeeded his father in 1815, inheriting, in addition to the baronetcy, Cranford Hall, Northamptonshire and Stretton Hall, Leicestershire.

He was appointed High Sheriff of Leicestershire for 1820–21 and elected MP for Northampton in  1830, sitting until 1832.

Sir George Robinson died in 1833. He had never married and was succeeded by his nephew George Stamp Robinson (1797–1873).

References

 

1766 births
1833 deaths
18th-century British people
19th-century British landowners
Robinson baronets, of London
People educated at Harrow School
Alumni of Trinity College, Cambridge
Members of the Parliament of the United Kingdom for English constituencies
UK MPs 1830–1831
UK MPs 1831–1832
High Sheriffs of Leicestershire